Pindrajora is a village in the Chas CD block in the Chas subdivision of the Bokaro District, Jharkhand. The village is 15.0 km from Chas Bokaro, 20 km from Bokaro Steel City and 93 km far from Ranchi.

Geography

Location

Area overview
Bokaro district consists of undulating uplands on the Chota Nagpur Plateau with the Damodar River cutting a valley right across. The East Bokaro Coalfield located in the Bermo-Phusro area and small intrusions of Jharia Coalfield make Bokaro a coal rich district. In 1965, one of the largest steel manufacturing units in the country, Bokaro Steel Plant, operated by Steel Authority of India Limited, was set-up at Bokaro Steel City. The Damodar Valley Corporation established its first thermal power station at Bokaro (Thermal). The soil is generally infertile and agriculture is mostly rain-fed.

Note: The map alongside presents some of the notable locations in the district. All places marked in the map are linked in the larger full screen map.

Civic administration

Police station
Pindrajora police station is located at Pindrajora.

Educational institutions 
 Crescent Public School
 Adarsh Vidya Mandir High School (AVM)
 St Mary Public School
sardar Patel school CBSE affiliated school
gurukula public school
Adarsh Siksha Niketan

The village hosts the only training college for primary teachers in Dhanbad and Bokaro. The village has also a State Government Basic School and a Sarvodaya High School.

Transport
NH 18 passes through Pindrajora.

See also 
 Gowai Baradge at Kendadih Village
 Sri Sri Kalika Maharani Temple

References 

Villages in Bokaro district
Tourist attractions in Jharkhand